Melanie Wegling (born 7 January 1990) is a German politician of the Social Democratic Party (SPD).

Political career 
Wegling became a member of the Bundestag in the 2021 German federal election, representing the constituency of Groß-Gerau. In parliament, she has since been serving on the Finance Committee.

Within her parliamentary group, Welling belongs to the Parliamentary Left, a left-wing movement.

Other activities
 Nuclear Waste Disposal Fund (KENFO), Alternate Member of the Board of Trustees (since 2022)

References 

Living people
1990 births
Politicians from Mainz
Members of the Bundestag for the Social Democratic Party of Germany
Members of the Bundestag 2021–2025
Female members of the Bundestag
21st-century German women politicians